The Dodge 50 Series, later known as the Renault 50 Series, were light commercial vehicles produced in the UK by Chrysler Europe and later Renault Véhicules Industriels between 1979 and 1993 as a replacement for the earlier Dodge Walk-Thru stepvan and smaller Dodge Spacevan cab-over van. The Dodge 50 series utilized the same cab as the American Dodge B series vans, however in a modified state catered for European regulations. The chassis however was British-deisgned and had no parts shared with the American van, being significantly bigger. 

The 50 series included a wide range of chassis and body configurations, including two distinctly different cab designs, and spanned the  revenue weight range. Various engines were offered, including the Perkins Phaser and 4.236. 

The RB44, a four-wheel-drive version based loosely on the Dodge van, was built by Reynolds Boughton (now known as Boughton Engineering) in the early 1990s.

Versions
Bodybuilding companies converted many into various configurations from tipper trucks to buses. Many were built as "chassis cabs" to have box bodies fitted; these were widely used by utility companies in the UK. They often came fitted with compressors and generators. Gradually this kind of vehicle fell out of favour, partly due to reliability issues relating to combining plant equipment with the vehicle drivetrain. The vehicle is otherwise toughly built. The utility companies today favour smaller vans with towed generators. The four-wheel-drive version saw some use with the British army since it was one of very few British-built trucks of the class, and it could carry considerably more cargo and equipment than even the largest Land Rover models.

Chrysler received financial assistance from the British Government which was desperate to support the ailing British motor industry. However, having inherited various struggling car and commercial vehicle marques (and factories) from the Rootes Group, notably the commercial marques Commer and Karrier, in addition to various French concerns, Chrysler Europe struggled to return a profit. In 1978, Chrysler pulled out of their European operations altogether, selling them to Peugeot. The cars and small vans became known as Talbots.

Peugeot takeover
However, Peugeot had little interest in commercial vehicles and the factory for the heavier models was run in partnership with Renault Véhicules Industriels, who sought a UK production site for engines for their existing Renault-branded models. They continued to manufacture the 50 Series, along with the small Dodge (formerly Commer) Spacevan, and the large Dodge 100 / Commando 2 Series of  trucks. The transition to Renault branding was slightly muddied by some vehicles bearing both a Dodge name and a Renault-diamond badge.

Renault 50
By 1987, the 50 Series had been updated and was badged as the Renault 50 Series; the UK incarnation of the Dodge marque ceased to be used for new vehicles. (Chrysler maintained an entirely separate Dodge brand in the U.S., and in 2006 began re-introducing Dodge car models from the USA into the UK market.) Renault continued to manufacture the 50 Series until 1993, but it was never a great sales success, even being forced to compete with other Renault products, in the form of the Master van, which Renault favoured in its export markets.

In 1994, Renault — keen to clear the factory for large-scale engine production — sold the production tooling to a Chinese manufacturer.

See also
Dodge 100 "Commando"
Dodge 500

External links

Rootes-Chrysler resource site - page about Spacevan and others
Specialised Dodge 50 website with manuals, image gallery, forum, and more.
Reynolds Boughton RB44 details
Boughton Engineering official site
A Dodge/Renault 50 used in Malta

References

50 Series
Dodge 50 Series
50 Series
Dodge UK